James Rowlands (1 October 1851 – 1 March 1920) was a British Liberal or Lib-Lab politician. He served as Liberal Member of Parliament for East Finsbury and Dartford, Kent.

A son of William Bull Rowlands. He married in 1879 Kate Boyden who died in 1905.  He was apprenticed to watch-case making. Early, he took an interest in politics; he organised registration in the borough of Finsbury. He was a member of the London Municipal Reform League, organising the Finsbury branch and becoming its Hon. Secretary. He was MP for East Finsbury, 1886–95. He was President of the Gas Consumers’ Protection League in 1893 and Secretary of Leaseholds Enfranchisement Association. He was elected at the General Election of 1906, defeating the Unionist MP and Father of the House, Rt Hon. Sir William Hart Dyke. He was defeated at the General Election of January 1910, but won his seat back at the General Election of December 1910. He sat in the House of Commons until his death in 1920. He took an active part in the international arbitration movement. He was a member of the last London School Board. He was Hon. Secretary of the Land Law Reform Association. He took an active part in Parliament in promoting Bills for reform of the land laws for town and country, and the housing question.

References

External links 
 

1851 births
1920 deaths
Liberal Party (UK) MPs for English constituencies
Liberal-Labour (UK) MPs
UK MPs 1886–1892
UK MPs 1892–1895
UK MPs 1906–1910
UK MPs 1910–1918
UK MPs 1918–1922
Members of the London School Board